Ana Lilić (born 28 September 1993) is a Serbian footballer who plays as a midfielder and has appeared for the Serbia women's national team.

Career
Lilić has been capped for the Serbia national team, appearing for the team during the 2019 FIFA Women's World Cup qualifying cycle.

References

External links
 
 
 

1993 births
Living people
Serbian women's footballers
Serbia women's international footballers
Women's association football midfielders
ŽFK Mašinac PZP Niš players